Johnny Staccato is an American private detective television series starring John Cassavetes which ran for 27 episodes on NBC from September 10, 1959 through March 24, 1960.

Synopsis
Titular character Johnny Staccato, played by John Cassavetes, is a jazz pianist/private detective. The setting for many episodes is a Greenwich Village jazz club belonging to his friend, Waldo, played by Eduardo Ciannelli. The show featured many musicians, such as Barney Kessel, Shelly Manne, Milt Holland, Red Mitchell, Red Norvo, and Johnny Williams. (Although the show was set in New York City, all of these men were closely identified with the West Coast jazz scene, and it was filmed largely in Los Angeles.) Elmer Bernstein composed both of the main theme tunes used and Stanley Wilson was music supervisor. Cassavetes also directed five episodes.

After its initial airing on NBC, ABC presented reruns of the series from March 27 to September 25, 1960.

On October 12, 2010, the series was released on Region 1 DVD by Timeless Media Group.

Episodes have aired on stations specializing in nostalgia programming, such as GetTV.

Notable guest stars

Warren Berlinger
Geraldine Brooks
Walter Burke
Elisha Cook, Jr. (twice)
Lloyd Corrigan
Frank DeKova
Norman Fell
Marianne Gaba
Ingrid Goude
Harry Guardino
Arline Hunter
Martin Landau
Michael Landon
Cloris Leachman
Ruta Lee
Sylvia Lewis
Charles McGraw
John Marley
Elizabeth Montgomery
Mary Tyler Moore
Susan Oliver
J. Pat O'Malley
Gena Rowlands
Vito Scotti
Dean Stockwell
Nita Talbot
Jack Weston

Production notes
Johnny Staccato aired at 8:30 p.m. Eastern on Thursdays opposite ABC's sitcom, The Real McCoys, created by Irving Pincus and starring Walter Brennan, Richard Crenna, and Kathleen Nolan, and CBS's western series, Johnny Ringo, starring Don Durant and Mark Goddard.

Episodes

Home media
Timeless Media Group released the complete series on DVD in Region 1 on October 12, 2010.

In popular culture
The show was later parodied on SCTV as Vic Arpeggio (portrayed by Joe Flaherty), a saxophonist/private investigator whose cases were usually solved by accident. Arpeggio claimed to have been “framed” for drug possession, and that the detective gig was merely a sideline until he got his solo career back on track.
Thomas Pynchon references Johnny Staccato in his 2009 novel Inherent Vice, set in late 1960s Los Angeles. Pynchon's main character, private investigator Larry "Doc" Sportello, praises Staccato as "the shamus of shamuses," ranking him with past greats Philip Marlowe and Sam Spade.
The theme, performed by Elmer Bernstein, received little attention in the US, but went to #4 in Britain.
Legendary artist Harvey Kurtzman parodied the show in his classic Jungle Book (Ballantine Books 1959) as "Thelonius Violence"
The Colts Drum and Bugle Corps' 2015 show was called "...and a Shot Rings Out: A Johnny Staccato Murder Mystery", which was a reference to the TV show.

References

External links

1959 American television series debuts
1960 American television series endings
1950s American crime drama television series
1960s American crime drama television series
American detective television series
Black-and-white American television shows
NBC original programming
Television series by Universal Television
Television shows set in New York City
Television shows filmed in Los Angeles